
Gmina Skołyszyn is a rural gmina (administrative district) in Jasło County, Subcarpathian Voivodeship, in south-eastern Poland.

The gmina contains part of the protected area called Pasmo Brzanki Landscape Park.

Villages
Gmina Skołyszyn contains the villages and settlements of Bączal Dolny, Bączal Górny, Harklowa, Jabłonica, Kunowa, Lipnica Górna, Lisów, Przysieki, Pusta Wola, Siedliska Sławęcińskie, Siepietnica, Skołyszyn, Sławęcin and Święcany.

Neighbouring gminas
Gmina Skołyszyn is bordered by the gminas of Biecz, Brzyska, Jasło, Lipinki and Szerzyny.

References
Polish official population figures 2006

Skolyszyn
Jasło County